The Broken Violin is an American silent film directed by Oscar Micheaux, released in 1928.

The film is based on Micheaux's unpublished novel, House of Mystery. It is about a beautiful African-American prodigy who plays violin. She overcomes her impoverished background and alcoholic father (who breaks her violin), in order to find success in music and love.

Cast
J. Homer Tutt, one of the Tutt Brothers, and Oscar Micheaux's wife Alice B. Russell starred in the film. Tutt, an accomplished vaudeville performer and producer with his brother, also had a lead role in Micheaux's films Birthright; these were his only known feature film roles. Tutt also appeared in short 1929 musical film Jailhouse Blues.

Birthright was Russell's first film, and she starred in a dozen more.

J. Homer Tutt
Ardell Dabney
Alice B. Russell
Ike Paul
Daisy Foster
Gertrude Snelson
Boots Hope
Ehtel Smith
W. Hill
William A. Clayton, Jr.

See also 

 The Broken Violin (1923 film)

References

External links 
 

1928 films
American black-and-white films
Silent American drama films
American silent feature films
1920s English-language films
1920s American films